The Chitta Gate ("White Gate") is a gateway located in the Walled City of Lahore, Pakistan, dating from 1650. The gate was once the Lahore's original "Delhi Gate," and the city's main entry-point.

Etymology 
The gate derived its current name from the white lime plaster which once covered its façade.

Location
The gate is on the Shahi Guzargah ("Royal Passage") route that connects the Lahore Fort to the Delhi Gate. The gate opens onto the Wazir Khan Chowk and is situated between the elaborately decorated Wazir Khan Mosque, and the Shahi Hammam. The gateway is adjacent to the Well of Dina Nath, and the shrine of Syed Sūf.

History
The gateway was built in 1650, during the reign of Mughal Emperor Shah Jahan. The gate served as Lahore's original Delhi Gate, but was replaced by the modern Delhi Gate, about 100 metres east of the current gateway. The gate served as the main entry gate to Lahore during the Mughal era.

Gallery

References

Gates of Lahore